Grave Secrets: The Legacy of Hilltop Drive is a 1992 television horror film directed by John Patterson that is supposedly based on real events. It starred Patty Duke, David Sleby and David Soul.

Plot
A family buys a home in a new housing development. They soon discover the house was built on the old "Freedomtown" African-American graveyard, though the developers deny the graveyard exists. The family sets out to prove otherwise while the body count grows. Jean (Patty Duke) soon uncovers the reality behind their 'dream house.'

See also
 List of ghost films

External links
 
 
 

1992 films
American supernatural horror films
1992 horror films
1990s English-language films
Films directed by John Patterson
1990s American films